Fovea (Latin for "pit"; plural foveae ) is a term in anatomy. It refers to a pit or depression in a structure.

Human anatomy 

Fovea centralis of the retina 
Fovea buccalis or Dimple 
Fovea of the femoral head
Trochlear fovea of the frontal bone
Pterygoid fovea of the mandible neck

Spider anatomy 

Fovea (spider), a depression in the centre of the carapace

See also
 Hilum, another term associated with anatomic pits or depressions
 Hilum (anatomy)
 Hilum (biology)